CITE-FM (107.3 MHz) is a French-language Canadian radio station located in Montreal, Quebec. Owned and operated by Bell Media, it airs an adult contemporary format. It is also the flagship station of the "Rouge FM" network, which operates across Quebec and in the Ottawa-Gatineau radio market. The studios and offices are located at the Bell Media building at 1717 Rene-Levesque Boulevard East in Downtown Montreal.

CITE-FM has an effective radiated power (ERP) of 42,900 watts, using an omnidirectional antenna from the Mount Royal candelabra tower. It broadcasts in the HD Radio hybrid format.

History

Radio-Cité (1977-1990)
CITE-FM signed on the air on May 7, 1977 as a sister station to 730 CKAC, owned by Telemedia. While it was still being approved and built, the station was called CKAC-FM. But when it reached the airwaves, the call sign changed to CITE-FM.  The previous year, a co-owned FM station in Sherbrooke at 102.7 began using the call letters CITE-FM. But when 107.3 in Montreal went on the air, the Sherbrooke station became CITE-FM-1. That call sign implies the Sherbrooke station is a rebroadcaster of the Montreal station. While the musical playlist was the same, CITE-FM-1 had local announcers and commercials. With the Sherbrooke station's powerful signal, it can easily be heard in much of Montreal and its suburbs. Telemedia may have wanted the call letters to be so similar that CITE-FM would get credit in the ratings if a listener in the Montreal market was tuned to CITE-FM-1. To this day, CITE-FM-1 simulcasts some programming from Montreal but has its own commercials and some local DJs.

Telemedia originally planned CITE-FM to be on 93.5 MHz, but the Canadian Radio-television and Telecommunications Commission (CRTC) changed that.  Telemedia was told to use 107.3 instead, as the Canadian Broadcasting Corporation (CBC) had targeted 93.5 MHz as a reserved frequency and rushed to move CBM-FM from to 93.5 in 1976.

CITE-FM aired a beautiful music format as Radio-Cité. It played instrumental cover versions of popular songs, along with some French and English middle of the road (MOR) vocals. Over time, to attract younger listeners, the number of vocals was increased while the instrumental music was scaled back.

Rock-Détente (1990-2011)

In 1990, CITE-FM completed its move from instrumental to vocal music, switching to a soft adult contemporary format. "Radio-Cité" was renamed Cité Rock-Détente. Telemedia's radio stations in Quebec and the Maritimes were purchased in 2002 by Astral Media. CITE-FM became the sister station of Astral's CKMF-FM. Because of federal competition laws, Astral Media was not permitted to keep 730 CKAC. Following the transaction, CITE-FM left the CKAC building that was on the corner of Sainte-Catherine Street and Peel Street, relocating to CKMF's building at the corner of René Lévesque Boulevard and Papineau Avenue.

In 2004, Astral revamped the Rock Détente network with a new logo. This resulted in Cité Rock-Détente being renamed as simply "107,3 RockDétente." The station no longer uses its call letters on the air, except when required by CRTC regulations.

Rouge FM (2011-present)

On August 18, 2011, at 4:00 p.m. EDT, the station ended its 21-year run with the "RockDétente" branding. All "RockDétente" stations, including CITE, were rebranded as Rouge FM.

The last song under "RockDétente" was "Pour que tu m'aimes encore" by Celine Dion, followed by a tribute to RockDétente's 23-year history. The first song under "Rouge" was "I Gotta Feeling" by Black Eyed Peas.

Transmitters
The following stations are known rebroadcasters of CITE-FM:

CITE-FM-1, a Rouge FM station in Sherbrooke, is not a rebroadcaster, but a separate station, despite the call sign suggesting otherwise. CITE-FM-2, also serving Sherbrooke, is a low-powered repeater of CITE-FM-1.

References

External links
107,3 Rouge
 

Ite
Ite
Radio stations established in 1977
Ite
Ite
1977 establishments in Quebec